Robert Long may refer to:

Politicians
Robert Long (lawyer and landowner) (c. 1391–1447), English lawyer, landowner, and Member of Parliament
Sir Robert Long, 1st Baronet (c. 1600–1673), Auditor of the Exchequer
Sir Robert Long, 6th Baronet (1705–1767), British politician 
Robert Long (soldier) (c. 1517–c. 1581), Esquire of the Body of Henry VIII of England
Robert Gavin Long (1937–2011), politician in Saskatchewan, Canada
Robert M. Long (1895–1977), politician in Wisconsin, United States
Robert B. Long (born 1957), American politician from Maryland

Military
Robert L. J. Long (1920–2002), U.S. Navy admiral
Robert Ballard Long (1771–1825), British general
Robert Long (British Army officer) (1937–2014), last Colonel of the Royal Hampshire Regiment

Sports
Robert Long (English cricketer) (1846–1924), English cricketer
Robert Long (New Zealand cricketer) (1932–2010), New Zealand cricketer

Others
Robert Long (priest) (1833–1907), British Anglican priest, Archdeacon of Auckland
Robert Cary Long Jr. (1810–1849), American architect
Robert A. Long (1850–1934), American lumber baron and philanthropist 
Robert Edward Crozier Long (1872–1938), Anglo-Irish journalist and author
Robert Spencer Long (1927–2015), 10th president of Shimer College
Robert Long (singer) (1943–2006), Dutch singer and television presenter
Rob Long (born 1965), American screenwriter
Robert Aaron Long (born 1999), suspect in the 2021 Atlanta spa shootings
Robert Paul Long, convicted of setting the Childers Palace Backpackers Hostel fire

See also
Bob Long (disambiguation)
Bobby Joe Long (1953–2019), Florida serial killer also known as Robert Joe Long